The 2020 Brisbane International was a professional tennis tournament on the 2020 WTA Tour. It was played on outdoor hard courts in Brisbane, Queensland, Australia. This was the twelfth edition of the tournament, which took place at the Queensland Tennis Centre in Tennyson from 6 to 12 January 2020 as part of the Australian Open Series in preparation for the first Grand Slam of the year. The ATP Tour edition of the event was replaced this year by the first edition of the ATP Cup.

Points and prize money

Point distribution

Prize money 

1Qualifiers prize money is also the Round of 32 prize money.
*per team

Singles main-draw entrants

Seeds 

 1 Rankings are as of 30 December 2019.

Other entrants 
The following players received wildcards into the singles main draw:
  Priscilla Hon
  Maria Sharapova
  Samantha Stosur
  Ajla Tomljanović

The following players received entry from the qualifying draw:
  Marie Bouzková 
  Jennifer Brady 
  Yulia Putintseva 
  Liudmila Samsonova

Doubles main-draw entrants

Seeds 

 1 Rankings are as of 30 December 2019.

Other entrants 
The following pair received a wildcard into the doubles main draw:
  Priscilla Hon /  Storm Sanders

Withdrawals 
During the tournament
  Kristina Mladenovic (viral illness)

Champions

Singles 

  Karolína Plíšková def.  Madison Keys 6–4, 4–6, 7–5

Doubles 

  Hsieh Su-wei /  Barbora Strýcová def.  Ashleigh Barty /  Kiki Bertens 3–6, 7–6(9–7), [10–8]

References

External links 
 

 
2020 WTA Tour
2020 in Australian tennis
2020
January 2020 sports events in Australia